The Irish bank strikes between 1966 and 1976 were three strikes of about a year's total duration which closed down all the clearing banks in the Republic of Ireland. The strikes provided economists with a unique opportunity to study the functioning of a modern economy without access to bank deposits.

The strikes affected all the associated banks: the Bank of Ireland, the Allied Irish Banks, the Northern Bank and the Ulster Bank. The strikes lasted from:
May 7 – July 30, 1966
May 1 – November 17, 1970
June 28 – September 6, 1976

The longest strike was of six months in 1970. The Central Bank made limited facilities available to non-associated banks to issue cash. Not just financial transactions were affected, many property deals were also affected because the documents were kept in the banks. The effect on the Irish economy was surprisingly small, as Irish citizens traded cheques among themselves based on mutual trust, effectively substituting them for cash. The country came through reasonably well in business terms despite the bank strike. A large firm (Palgrave Murphy) failed when the strike ended and settlements were made but its failure was probably inevitable anyway. The strike had little effect on the main economic concerns which were unemployment and industrial unrest caused by inflation.

References

Banking in Ireland
1966 in Ireland
1970 in Ireland
1976 in Ireland
1966 in economics
1970 in economics
1976 in economics
1966 labor disputes and strikes
1970 labor disputes and strikes
1976 labor disputes and strikes
Labour disputes in Ireland
History of banking